Westerwick is a settlement on Mainland in Shetland, Scotland. The settlement is within the parish of Sandsting. It faces south with high cliffs on both sides of the wick. There is a small stony beach at the head, and the surrounding land is greener with fewer rocky outcrops than the usual Shetland scene.

Westerwick is separated from Silwick by the Ward of Silwick and is about three miles from Skeld, on the West Shetland Mainland. There are just a few houses here and the whole area makes for fine cliff walking.

Westerwick was the birthplace of Thomas Alexander Robertson, better known as the poet Vagaland.

References

 This article is based on http://shetlopedia.com/Westerwick a GFDL wiki.

External links

Canmore - Westerwick

Villages in Mainland, Shetland